The 2014 Dunlop 24H Dubai was the 9th running of the Dubai 24 Hour endurance race. It took place at the Dubai Autodrome in Dubai, United Arab Emirates, and ran between 10–11 January 2014.

Race result
Class Winners in bold.

References

External links
 

Dubai 24 Hour
Dubai 24 Hour
Dubai 24 Hour